The 1987 DFB-Supercup was the inaugural DFB-Supercup, an annual football match contested by the winners of the previous season's Bundesliga and DFB-Pokal competitions.

The match was played at the Waldstadion in Frankfurt, and contested by league champions Bayern Munich and cup winners Hamburger SV.

Teams

Match

Details

See also
1986–87 Bundesliga
1986–87 DFB-Pokal

References

1987
FC Bayern Munich matches
Hamburger SV matches
1987–88 in German football cups